Carsten Schlangen (born 31 December 1980) is a German middle distance runner who specialises in the 1500 metres.

Born in Meppen, West Germany, his first major competition was the 2006 European Athletics Championships where he finished tenth in the heats of the 1500 m. He competed at the Internationales Stadionfest in 2006 – his first IAAF Golden League meeting. He reached the global stage in 2008 and just missed out on the 1500 m at the 2008 IAAF World Indoor Championships. He made it to the semi-finals of the 1500 m at the 2008 and 2012 Olympic Games but again closely missed out on making the final.

At the 2009 European Athletics Indoor Championships, he finished fourth in his heat but did not progress to the final. Schlangen took the 1500 m at the 2009 German Athletics Championships and represented his country at the 2009 World Championships in Athletics. He retained his national title at the 2010 German Athletics Championships and attended the 2010 European Athletics Championships. Despite being an outsider for the podium, he took the silver medal in the 1500 m behind Arturo Casado, who won in his native Spain.

Competition record

References

External links 
 
 
 Carsten Schlangen at the German Athletics Association (DLV)
 
 
 

1980 births
Living people
People from Meppen
German male middle-distance runners
German national athletics champions
Athletes (track and field) at the 2008 Summer Olympics
Athletes (track and field) at the 2012 Summer Olympics
Olympic athletes of Germany
European Athletics Championships medalists
Sportspeople from Lower Saxony